Houxi Town is a township-level division of Jimei District, Xiamen City, Fujian, China.

See also
List of township-level divisions of Fujian

References

Township-level divisions of Fujian